The 2011 FIRS Roller Hockey World Cup U-20 was the 5th edition of the FIRS Roller Hockey World Cup U-20. It was held in September 2011 in Barcelos.

Venues
Barcelos was the host city of the tournament, and the rink was the Pavilhão Municipal de Barcelos.

Squads
Each team's squad for the 2011 World Cup consisted of 10 players.

Matches
All times are Portugal Time (UTC0).

Group stage

Group A

Group B

Group C

Group D

Knockout stage

Championship

Quarterfinals

Semifinals

Final

5th-8th place

9th-12th place

13th-15th Place

Final standing

References

External links
World Cup Official website

CIRH website
Concil of Barcelos

FIRS Roller Hockey World Cup U-20
F
FIRS U-20 World Cup, 2011
2011 FIRS U-20 World Cup
2011 FIRS U-20 World Cup